Marina Vladimirovna Sergina (born 2 March 1986 in Polyarnye Zori, Russian SSR, Soviet Union) is a Russian ice hockey forward.

International career
Sergina was selected for the Russia national women's ice hockey team in the 2010 Winter Olympics. She played in all five games, recording one goal and two assists to tie for the team lead in points.

Sergina has also appeared for Russia at four IIHF Women's World Championships. Her first appearance came in 2008.

Career statistics

International career

References

External links
Eurohockey.com Profile
Sports-Reference Profile

1986 births
Living people
Ice hockey players at the 2010 Winter Olympics
Olympic ice hockey players of Russia
People from Murmansk Oblast
Russian women's ice hockey forwards
HC Tornado players
Sportspeople from Murmansk Oblast